Cortiella is a genus of flowering plants belonging to the family Apiaceae.

Its native range is Tibet, Himalaya.

Species:

Cortiella caespitosa 
Cortiella cortioides 
Cortiella hookeri 
Cortiella lamondiana

References

Apioideae